Welles is an American rock musician. He previously performed under the name Jeh Sea Wells. He was also the front man for the band Dead Indian, formed in 2012, and Cosmic-American, formed sometime in 2015.

Career
Wells grew up in Ozark, Arkansas. Under the name Jeh Sea Wells, Wells began his career around 2012, releasing home-made recordings of his music, putting them up on sites such as SoundCloud and Bandcamp. He released several albums and loose tracks on these sites, before eventually taking them down later. He formed the band Dead Indian sometime in 2012, along with Dirk Porter and Simon Martin. It was during this time he also began using the name "Breck Shipley". In 2014, he released a song titled Summer,  and shortly afterwards, another song titled Xmas 97 under his "Jeh Sea Wells" name. In 2015, as part of Pigeons and Planes Nirvana cover song compilation Teenage Angst Has Paid Off Well, Wells recorded a cover of Heart-Shaped Box. 

Dead Indian released two albums, Lead Me to the Sky and When We Live, as well as one EP, Grey, during their tenure. It was announced Dead Indian was to break up on July 21, 2015 after one last concert, which was held on August 7, 2015 at The Smoke & Barrel Tavern in Fayetteville, Arkansas. They released one final collection of covers they frequently played live, Far Out, about a month later. In September 2015, he and Dead Indian drummer Simon Martin formed a new band called Cosmic American along with Skyler Greene and Blake Foster. They played three songs on Fayetteville Public Television in April 2016, which was uploaded to YouTube. The band began recording an album but broke up before it was released after playing a final show on July 15, 2016.

In early 2017, Wells decided to rebrand his music going forward as Welles. He has released one single with a band as Welles, Are You Feeling Like Me, along with its B-side Into Ashes.  In March 2017, Welles released a song titled "Life Like Mine" from his upcoming EP titled Codeine on C3 Records. In May 2017, Welles released a music video for the song "Life Like Mine", from the EP Codeine. He released the album Red Trees and White Trashes on June 15, 2018.

During the COVID-19 pandemic of 2020, Wells began releasing a series of EPs on his Bandcamp, starting with non-essential business, an EP that moved away from his traditional sound, and towards a self-described "Jazz funk" sound. He would go on to release two more that year, Q2, self-described as “country folk americana whatever” and Joe Dirt Cobain, which would see him return to his alternative rock sound.

Discography

as Jeh Sea Wells
Albums
Indian Summer (2012)
When We Die (2013)
Demonstrations (2015)
Chaff (2016)
Gemini Sweethearts and Daisy Chains (2016)
Pall Mall Church (2016)
All of Life is Piss (2017)
Space Camp Summer 18 (2018)

EPs
So We Kept Looking (2013)
non-essential business (2020)
Q2 (2020)
Joe Dirt Cobain (2020)

Singles
"1 a.m." (2012)
"Big Grey Sky" (2013)
Summer (2014)
"Xmas 97" (2014)
"Don't Let Me Down" (2020)

as Welles
Albums
Red Trees and White Trashes (2018)

EPs
Codeine (2017, C3 Records)

Singles
"Are You Feeling Like Me" (2017)
"Seventeen" (2018)

with Dead Indian
Albums
Lead Me to the Sky (2013)
When We Live (2014)

EPs
Grey (2013)
Far Out - The Covers (2015)

with Cosmic-American
EPs
Out Far (2015)

References

Musicians from Arkansas